Zsuzsa Körmöczy (25 August 1924 – 16 September 2006) was a female tennis player from Hungary. She reached a career high of World No. 2 in women's tennis, and won the 1958 French Open at the age of 34.

Early life
She was born in Budapest, Hungary, and was Jewish.

Tennis career
In Hungary, as a 16-year-old in 1940 she won the national doubles and mixed doubles titles, and she later won the national singles title six times, and the doubles or mixed doubles trophies 10 times.

According to Lance Tingay of The Daily Telegraph and the Daily Mail, Körmöczy was ranked in the world top 10 in 1953, 1955, 1956, and 1958 and again from 1959 through 1961 (no rankings issued from 1940 through 1945), reaching a career high of World No. 2 in those rankings in 1958 at the age of 34.

She won the singles title at the 1958 French Championships at the age of 33 and reached the semifinals at Wimbledon in 1958. She was named Hungarian Sportswoman of the Year in 1958 after having won the French Championships the same year. She became the first sportswoman granted this award. She won eight of the nine tournaments she entered in 1958, and reached the semi-finals at Wimbledon.  In 1959 she made Wimbledon's ‘round of eight’, finishing sixth, and was the French Open Singles runner-up.

She retired from competition in 1964 to work as a coach for Vasas (the Ironworker Union's Sports Club) and act as the national tennis association's manager. After the fall of communism, she was decorated by new democratic governments in 1994 and 2003.

In 2007, she was inducted posthumously into the International Jewish Sports Hall of Fame.

Grand Slam finals

Singles (1 title, 1 runner-up)

Grand Slam singles tournament timeline

1In 1947, the French Championships were held after Wimbledon.

See also 
 Performance timelines for all female tennis players who reached at least one Grand Slam final
List of select Jewish tennis players

References

External links
 
 

1924 births
2006 deaths
Hungarian female tennis players
French Championships (tennis) champions
Jewish tennis players
Hungarian Jews
Grand Slam (tennis) champions in women's singles
Jewish sportswomen
Tennis players from Budapest